Robert of Namur may refer to:

 Robert of Namur (died 981), count of the Lommegau 
 Robert of Namur (1323–1391), a noble from the Low Countries close to King Edward III of England